Protorhopala picta is a species of beetle in the family Cerambycidae. It was described by Léon Fairmaire in 1899.

References

Pteropliini
Beetles described in 1899